Matt Skura (born February 17, 1993) is an American football center who is a free agent. He played college football at Duke and signed with the Baltimore Ravens as an undrafted free agent in 2016.

High school career
Skura attended Worthington Kilbourne High School in Columbus, Ohio. He was listed as the No. 13 center in the nation by ESPN.com and served as a team captain as a senior.

College career
Served as team captain as a senior. Played in 50 career games (40 starts), Skura was a two-time All-ACC selection.

Professional career

Baltimore Ravens
Skura was signed by the Baltimore Ravens as an undrafted free agent on May 6, 2016. He was waived on September 3, 2016, and was signed to the practice squad the next day. He signed a reserve/future contract with the Ravens on January 2, 2017.

On September 2, 2017, Skura was waived by the Ravens and was later re-signed to the practice squad. He was promoted to the active roster on September 19, 2017. He started 12 games at right guard for the Ravens in 2017 in place of the injured Marshal Yanda, missing two games due to a knee injury.

After Ryan Jensen departed in free agency, Skura was named the starting center in 2018, where he started all 16 games.

In 2019, Skura started the first 11 games at center before suffering a season-ending knee injury in Week 12 against the Los Angeles Rams and was placed on injured reserve the following day. The Ravens did, however, go on to win that game, 45–6. Skura's team would go on to finish 14-2 and lose to the 6th seeded Tennessee Titans in the Divisional Round 28-12.

Skura re-signed on a one-year restricted free agent tender on April 10, 2020. He was placed on the active/physically unable to perform list at the start of training camp on August 2, 2020. He was activated on August 16, 2020. In Week 10 against the New England Patriots, Skura's snaps led to three botched quarterback-center exchanges during the 23–17 loss. He was placed on the reserve/COVID-19 list by the team on November 25, 2020, and activated on December 4.

Miami Dolphins
On March 19, 2021, Skura signed a one-year contract with the Miami Dolphins. He was released on August 30, 2021.

New York Giants
On September 2, 2021, Skura was signed to the New York Giants practice squad. He was promoted to the active roster on September 16, 2021. On November 3, 2021, the New York Giants announced that Skura was in the COVID protocol. On November 4, 2021 the New York Giants announced that Skura was cleared to return to practice.

Los Angeles Rams
On September 21, 2022, Skura signed with the practice squad of the Los Angeles Rams. He was promoted to the active roster on October 11, 2022.

References

1993 births
Living people
American football centers
Baltimore Ravens players
Duke Blue Devils football players
Los Angeles Rams players
Miami Dolphins players
New York Giants players
Players of American football from Columbus, Ohio